Ha-Hov, aka HaChov, or in English, The Debt, is a 2007 Israeli drama-thriller film directed by Assaf Bernstein and starring Gila Almagor, Yuriy Chepurnov, and Oleg Drach, about three retired Mossad agents confronted by a challenge from their past.

It was remade as the 2010 American/British film The Debt, mixing the Mengele and Eichmann stories.

Cast 
Actors with corresponding major characters:

Gila Almagor (as Rachel Brener) 
Yuriy Chepurnov
Oleg Drach 
Sergiy Dvoretskyy  
Netta Garti (as young Rachel Brener) 
Evgeniya Gladiy  
Reut Hajaj 
Eran Ivanir   
Aleksandr Kulish   
Yehezkel Lazarov (as young Ehud)
Vlad Levitskyy 
Victoria Malektorovych
Sergei Malyuga
  
Judith Naman   
Nadav Netz   
Alexander/ (as Zvi)
Edgar Selge (as Max Rainer) 
Elena Sikorskaya  
Alexandra Smolyarova   
Dmitry Sova  
Viktor Stepanenko   
Sergiy Strelnikov   
Oded Teomi (as Ehud) 
Itay Tiran (as young Zvi) 
Alon Zamek
Arieh Adler (narrator)

Plot 
The film is not based on fact, and centers on an Israeli-Mossad Kidon team who in 1964 capture notorious Nazi doctor Josef Mengele who had performed human experimentation in a German extermination camp, and, when he escapes from them, they report him as being shot once in the head and killed during his attempted escape. In the following years, the agents receive numerous accolades for their actions, with none suspecting the truth, but in the late 1990s, they learn he may be alive, repentant, and likely to expose the truth of the events.

Cinematic history 
The film was nominated for four awards by the Israeli Film Academy in 2007: Best Art Direction, Ido Dolev; Best Cinematography,
Giora Bejach; Best Costumes, Inbal Shuki; and Best Supporting Actress, Neta Garty.

The film has had no theatrical release in United States , but a version with English subtitles has screened at U.S. film festivals and has been shown on the Sundance cable-television channel.

A U.S. remake titled The Debt starring Helen Mirren, Sam Worthington, Ciarán Hinds and Tom Wilkinson was directed by John Madden from a screenplay by Matthew Vaughn, Jane Goldman and Peter Straughan. It premiered at the Deauville American Film Festival on September 4, 2010, and was originally scheduled for wide release in December 2010 until this date was pushed back to August 31, 2011.

References

External links
 
 

Israeli thriller drama films
2000s Hebrew-language films
Films shot in Israel
Films about Jews and Judaism
Films about the Mossad
2007 films
2000s spy films
Films directed by Assaf Bernstein
Films set in 1964
Films set in the 1990s
Films about Nazi hunters